The overall nutritional quality index was a nutritional rating system developed at the Yale-Griffin Prevention Research Center in 2008. A proprietary algorithm assigned foods a score between 1 and 100 intended to reflect the overall nutritional value a portion of the given food provided. The system was marketed commercially as NuVal by NuVal, LLC, a joint venture with Topco Associates. Over 1600 grocery stores in the United States placed NuVal scores on product shelf tags next to the price. The commercial product was discontinued in 2017 amid accusations of conflicts of interest and criticism of NuVal LLC's refusal to publish the algorithm. Either of which may have contributed to some inconsistencies in scoring where certain processed foods scored higher than, for instance, canned fruits and vegetables.

Description
The algorithm considers thirty nutrient factors, like the relative portions of vitamins, sugar, saturated fat, and trans fats and the quality of the protein and fat, and produces a score from one to 100. Higher scores represent greater overall nutritional value. However, the actual algorithm, including the relative weights of the nutrients, was never disclosed to the public.

Broccoli, blueberries, okra, oranges, and green beans were some foods that received the best score (100) while ice pops and soft drinks received the worst (1).

Selected NuVal Scores

See also

Nutrient density

References

External links
 Yale-Griffin Prevention Research Center

Nutrition
Rating systems